Thinkers Magazine is a monthly magazine based in Abuja, Nigeria. Thinkers Magazine is a sister publication of the daily online-based Thinkers Newspaper published by Thinkers Communications Limited. Thinkers Communications Limited was established in 2008 in Abuja, Nigeria.

History
Thinkers Magazine is a monthly magazine based in Abuja, Nigeria. Thinkers Magazine is a sister publication of the daily online-based Thinkers Newspaper published by Thinkers Communications Limited, a nedua, marketing, advertising and public relations out Thinkers Communications Limited was established in 2008 in Abuja, Nigeria.

Content
The magazine has an online edition and its content are republished. The magazine has an Annual Lecture and Awards ceremony instituted to recognise individuals and institutions in the public and private sector that have made outstanding contributions in their various fields of endeavour.

Personnel 
The founder is Abdullahi G. Mohammed, a media entrepreneur, politician farmer. The Chairman/CEO is Malam Abubakar Ibrahim, the Dallatun Lafia, the capital of Nasarawa state, North-Central, Nigeria.

References

External links
 Official Website

Mass media in Abuja